Julius Beer (1836–1880) was a German-born English businessman, banker and newspaper baron. He owned The Observer from 1870 to 1880.

Biography

Early life
Julius Beer was born in 1836 in Frankfurt, Germany.

Career
Beer made his fortune in the London Stock Exchange. He was a member of the London Banking Association.

In 1870, he purchased The Observer newspaper, which he owned until his death in 1880.

Personal life
Beer was married to Thyrza Beer (died 1881). They had a son and a daughter:
Frederick Arthur Beer (died 1903; married Rachel Sassoon (1858–1927)).
Ada Sophia Beer (1867–1875, died aged 8 years old) The main sculpture by Henry Hugh Armstead inside the Beer Mausoleum at Highgate Cemetery represents this young girl being protected by an angel.

Beer died in 1880. His mausoleum in Highgate Cemetery has been listed as Grade II since 14 May 1974. It was designed by English architect John Oldrid Scott (1841–1913). Interred in it are:
 Ada Sophia Beer (his daughter, d.1875)
 Julius Beer (d.1880)
 Thyrza Beer (his wife, d.1881)
 Arnold Beer (his brother, d.1880)
 Frederick (his son, d.1901)

References

1836 births
1880 deaths
Burials at Highgate Cemetery
British bankers
German emigrants to the United Kingdom
19th-century German Jews
The Observer people
Businesspeople from Frankfurt
19th-century British journalists
Male journalists
19th-century British male writers
19th-century British writers
British people of German-Jewish descent
Naturalised citizens of the United Kingdom
19th-century British businesspeople